Cara (Chara, Fachara), also called Teriya after the village it is spoken in, is a small Plateau language of central Nigeria. Cara is spoken by about 3,000 people in Teriya village, Bassa, Plateau State, Nigeria.

Ethnologue places Cara in Central Plateau. The assignment to Beromic follows Blench (2008).

References

Further reading
A Sociolinguistic Profile of the Cara (cfd) Language of Plateau State, Nigeria

External links
Cara wordlist

Beromic languages
Languages of Nigeria